Erika Kirpu (born 22 June 1992) is an Estonian right-handed épée fencer.

Kirpu is a two-time team European champion and 2017 team world champion.

A two-time Olympian, Kirpu is a 2021 team Olympic champion.

Kirpu competed in the 2016 Rio de Janeiro Olympic Games and the 2020 Tokyo Olympic Games.

She graduated from Tartu Annelinna Gümnaasium in 2010 and from the Faculty of Law of Tallinn University of Technology in 2014.

She lives in Milan, Italy with her partner and fellow épée fencer Enrico Garozzo.

Medal Record

Olympic Games

World Championship

European Championship

Grand Prix

World Cup

References

External links

1992 births
Living people
Estonian female épée fencers
Fencers at the 2015 European Games
European Games medalists in fencing
Olympic fencers of Estonia
Fencers at the 2016 Summer Olympics
European Games silver medalists for Estonia
European Games bronze medalists for Estonia
Sportspeople from Moscow
World Fencing Championships medalists
Fencers at the 2020 Summer Olympics
Olympic medalists in fencing
Medalists at the 2020 Summer Olympics
Olympic gold medalists for Estonia
20th-century Estonian women
21st-century Estonian women